Frangy is a commune in the Haute-Savoie department in the Auvergne-Rhône-Alpes region in south-eastern France.

See also
Communes of the Haute-Savoie department

Culture and heritage
 :fr:Ferme de Bel-Air, heritage protection as Monument historique since December 7, 2010. région level importance, formerly called "Inventaire Supplémentaire des Monuments Historiques" (ISMH).

References

Communes of Haute-Savoie